Mata is a genus of cicadas in the family Cicadidae. There are currently five described species in Mata. In 2021, three new species were described from Meghalaya, India.

Species
These five species belong to the genus Mata:
Mata kama (Distant, 1881) 
Mata lenonia 
Mata meghalayana 
Mata rama Distant, 1912 
Mata ruffordii

References

Further reading

 
 
 
 

Cicadidae genera
Oncotympanini